University Laboratory School and College also known as ULAB, is a school and college located in Dhaka, Bangladesh. It is on the campus of Institute of Education and Research, Dhaka University, Nilkhet Road, Dhaka and is under the institute's management. It is a part of Institute of Education and Research.

References

Schools in Dhaka District
University of Dhaka
Colleges in Dhaka District
Universities and colleges in Dhaka